O. lambertii may refer to:

 Omphalobium lambertii, a woody plant
 Oxytropis lambertii, a Northern American legume